Albaron (3,638 m) is a mountain of the Graian Alps in Savoie, France. It is a popular mountain to climb due to its relative ease and elegant summit, which appears as a sharp pyramid, especially from the southeast or north. It is also popular mountain with ski mountaineers. Along with the nearby mountain Uia di Ciamarella it forms a large glacial basin. It was first climbed in 1866 by Yeamin and Shahd.

References

Mountains of the Graian Alps
Alpine three-thousanders
Mountains of Savoie
Three-thousanders of France